Completely is the seventh studio album by American country music group Diamond Rio, released on July 23, 2002. Two of the album's singles, "Beautiful Mess" and "I Believe", reached number one on the Billboard U.S. Hot Country Singles & Tracks charts. Also released from this album were "Wrinkles" and "We All Fall Down", which peaked at numbers 18 and 45, respectively, on the country charts. The album was certified gold by the RIAA and reached number 23 on the Billboard 200, making it the band's most successful album on the chart. "Make Sure You've Got It All" was originally recorded by Collin Raye on his 1998 album The Walls Came Down. "If You'd Like Some Lovin'" was written and originally recorded by David Ball for his album, Starlite Lounge in 1996.

Track listing

Personnel 

Diamond Rio
 Marty Roe – vocals 
 Dan Truman – keyboards, acoustic piano, Wurlitzer electric piano, Hammond organ
 Jimmy Olander – acoustic guitar, electric guitars, 12-string guitar, banjo, dobro, Danelectro, vibraphone, sampling
 Gene Johnson – mandolin, harmony vocals
 Dana Williams – bass, harmony vocals 
 Brian Prout – drums

Guest musicians
 Carl Marsh – string arrangements and conductor 
 The Nashville String Machine – strings

Production 
 Diamond Rio – producers
 Mike Clute – producer, engineer, mixing 
 Steve Crowder – assistant engineer
 Pete Miskinis – assistant engineer 
 Leslie Richter – assistant engineer 
 Benny Quinn – mastering 
 Astrid Herbold May – art direction, design 
 Beth Lee – art direction, photography 
 Keith Tucker – cover design 
 Russ Harrington – photography 
 Claudia Fowler – stylist

Charts

Weekly charts

Year-end charts

Certifications

References

2002 albums
Diamond Rio albums
Arista Records albums